The Overwatch League (OWL) is a professional esports league for the video game Overwatch, produced by its developer, Blizzard Entertainment. The Overwatch League follows the model of other traditional North American professional sporting leagues by using a set of permanent, city-based teams backed by separate ownership groups.

The league uses the regular season and playoffs format rather than promotion and relegation used commonly in other esports and non-North American leagues, with players on the roster being assured a minimum annual salary, benefits, and a portion of winnings and revenue-sharing based on team performance. The league was announced in 2016 with its inaugural season taking place in 2018.

Format
The Overwatch League is owned by Blizzard Entertainment and run by Major League Gaming, which is also owned by Blizzard's parent company Activision Blizzard. The Overwatch League plays out similar to most North American professional sports leagues, in which all teams play scheduled games against other teams to vie for position in the season's playoffs, rather than the approach of team promotion and relegation more commonly used in other esports leagues. The league currently features twenty teams split between two conferences based on their location: East and West. The East will have eight teams, while the West will have twelve.

The 2018 season consisted of non-regulation pre-season play, a regular season divided into four stages, and a post-season playoffs tournament to determine the championship team for the season. Each regular season stage lasted five weeks, with each stage ending with a short playoff of the top teams based on that stage's records to determine stage champions. Teams played 40 matches across the regular season, playing teams both within and outside their division. The post-season playoffs used teams' overall standings across all stages. The top standing team in both divisions received the top two seed in the playoffs, followed by a fixed number of teams determined from across both divisions. An All-Star weekend is also held, featuring two division-based teams selected by league representatives and voted on by fans.

The 2019 season format was similar to that of the previous season, though stage playoffs for the fourth stage were eliminated and the number of matches was decreased to 28, among other changes. The 2020 season introduced a number of changes, including a home-and-away format, where each team would host home games with up to eight teams per homestand event, and the elimination of the stage format. This format was eventually changed to a bimonthly tournament-based season in April due to the global impact of the COVID-19 pandemic.

Teams are awarded with monetary prizes for how they place at the end of the regular season, as well as for participating and placing high in the stage playoffs and post-season tournament. For example, the first season had a total prize pool of  available, with the top prize of $1 million awarded to the post-season championship team.

Rules

Overwatch is a five-versus-five team-based first-person shooter video game. Broadly, the goal is to work with team members to eliminate or repel opponents while attacking, defending, or competing for an objective. Players select from the game's roster of thirty-three heroes, split between classes of Damage (the main attackers), Support (providing healing and other buffs), and Tank (shielding teammates with high health amounts) each with their own pre-designed set of weapons and skill kits, though each player on a team must play a unique hero. Starting with stage four of the 2019 season, each team must be composed of two Damage heroes, two Supports, and two Tanks. A player can switch to an available hero within the same class if they are eliminated prior to respawning, or if they return to their current spawn point, which allows for teams to adjust their composition dynamically based on the current situation.

Within league play, a regular season match features two teams (one selected as the home team, the other as the visiting team) playing a best-of-five format, with each map featuring a predetermined map type, following the same gameplay format as with normal competitive mode in Overwatch: Control maps, played on a best-of-three rounds, and Assault, Escort, and Hybrid maps, with each team having at least one chance as the attacking team. The pool of specific maps from the standard Overwatch rotation are determined periodically, allowing the teams to determine their player lineups and strategy while also changing the season's metagame. A team may call in substitutes for players only between maps. The team that wins three maps first wins the match. If teams are tied after four games, a tiebreaker game played on a Control map (which cannot end in a tie) is used to break the tie and determine the match winner. Standings are based primarily on the overall match win–loss record, but ties are broken based on the total map win–loss record. Any further ties for tournament placement are broken based first on the head-to-head game win–loss record, then head-to-head match count.

Overwatch League games are played on a custom server controlled by Blizzard; this server is also available to players for practices. This version of the game receives similar updates to the main commercial game, adding new maps and heroes, and altering the various hero abilities based on testing within the Public Test Realm. However, these updates are not applied immediately as they are for the commercial game, but instead no more frequent than once every six weeks. For example, a late January 2018 patch, which had significant effects on characters like Mercy and thus had potential to upset the metagame, was not applied to the league server until mid-February, at the start of the second stage. However, teams are given access to private servers updated to alongside the main release of Overwatch for them to practice and scrimmage against other teams to learn and develop strategies on updates and patches before experiencing them in official matches. For matches, each player is provided with an identical desktop computer, monitor, and pair of noise-cancelling headphones to play on to eliminate any handicaps related to computational or graphics processing, but players may use their preferred keyboard and mouse.

Player eligibility and benefits

While Overwatch is played in teams of five, Overwatch League teams can have up to six additional players that can be swapped between maps. A team's membership is locked at the start of the season, but a mid-season signing period allows teams to bring in new players or trade players between teams. Following the end of the season, teams have about one month to extend current player contracts, bring on players from affiliated Overwatch Contenders teams, or hold private tryout sessions. Subsequently, all unsigned players by the end of this period enter free agency during which players can negotiate with teams to become part of the roster; in the case of when expansion teams are added, there is a month-long period where expansion teams have exclusive negotiating rights before other teams can engage. A team's minimum roster is to be set prior to the season's pre-season matches, about two months prior to season play, but they can expand and change this roster up until a specified date. The league is not region-locked, so teams can use players of any nationality to fill their ranks, as long as the team ownership is based in that city or region. For example, the London Spitfire at the onset of the first season was entirely made up of South Korean players. The only restriction on players is to be of at least 17 years old and to be able to travel internationally.

Overwatch League players, while on a team's contract, are paid an annual salary. In the first year, a player's salary was a minimum of  set by the league. Additionally, the league offers players with health and retirement benefits, as well as housing and training support. Blizzard required team owners to provide the signed players with bonuses representing at least 50% of the team's winnings and revenue. Players can negotiate for larger amounts with their team's owners and larger portion of the bonus revenue-sharing from tournament winnings and other income. For example, in 2017, Jay "sinatraa" Won secured the league's highest salary of $150,000 for his spot on the San Francisco Shock, along with a 50% share of the team's bonuses.

Players are expected to follow a code of conduct set by Blizzard while playing and representing the league, and may face suspension and fines for violating these, in addition to any penalties the team itself may impose. A noted incident shortly after the league's launch saw Dallas Fuel's Félix "xQc" Lengyel suspended by the league for four games and fined $2,000 for making homophobic comments about another player; the Fuel further suspended him for the remainder of the first stage of play. Following additional conduct violations in the second stage that led to further suspension, xQc was released by the Fuel. Blizzard has since started its online "discipline tracker" in December 2018 to list players who have been temporarily suspended or fined for actions related to their behavior as representatives of the Overwatch League. Players, as part of their benefits, receive media training to help with speaking to the press and public about their roles, an issue that has been a problem in previous organized esport systems.

Open Division and Contenders
Professional teams in the league are given the opportunity to scout for new players through two additional competitive leagues run by Blizzard. The Open Division, first started in June 2017, allows amateur teams to compete against each other in a structured season. Those that qualify at the end of the season are seeded into a post-season tournament with intra-regional matches. Players that complete all non-playoff games for their team can earn a small amount of credit to Blizzard's digital storefront, while regional winning teams can earn higher prize payouts. The Open division is played across seven different regions: Australia, China, Europe, Korea, North America, Pacific, and South America.

Players or teams can then move up from the Open Division into Overwatch Contenders, a minor league to the Overwatch League. Contenders was launched in 2018 to merge existing regional tournaments into a structure to support the Overwatch League. Contenders consists of several global divisions with a number of teams within each, which may include both professional and amateur players. Contender teams may be affiliated with an Overwatch League team as an academy team, and up to two players per academy team can be signed to two-way contracts to be moved between their academy team and Overwatch League team.

Contenders was launched in the first half of 2018 with five divisions with 12 teams each: Korea (replacing the Overwatch Apex tournament), China (replacing the Overwatch Premier Series), and Pacific (replacing Overwatch Pacific Championship for other Asian-Pacific countries), and adding in North America and European divisions. Prior to the second 2018 Contenders season, Blizzard added two additional divisions, for Australia and South America, bringing the total to seven. The top eight teams from the Open Division within each region are also invited to Contenders Trials, a weekly promotion and relegation tournament to compete in the following week of Contenders. For its second season in 2019, Blizzard adjusted the format by reducing the number of teams in each region to eight, while dividing the North American region into East and West divisions. Blizzard also added a regional limit of the number of "import players", which are those that live outside the division's region, to a maximum of three. These changes were reverted for the 2020 season.

History

Concept

Overwatch development started around 2013, around the same time that esports and spectator-driven video gaming were starting to gain wide popularity due to accessibility of live streaming platforms. However, the game's development was not dedicated towards esports; according to lead director Jeff Kaplan, "it's dangerous to be overly committed to esport too early in the lifespan of the game" based on past experiences Blizzard had had in esports, and instead planned any esports-related goals by observing the game's player community. During Overwatchs beta period, between late 2015 and mid-2016, Blizzard observed that players were already forming ad hoc competitions and tournaments for the game. According to Nate Nanzer, who was Blizzard's global director of research and consumer insights prior to being the league's commissioner, Blizzard considered the potential if they were the ones in charge of setting up these competitions. Nanzer stated: "If we structure a league the right way and put the right investment behind it, we can actually monetize it in a way that's not too dissimilar from traditional sports." Building from this insight, Blizzard started crafting the basis for the Overwatch League. Part of this included adding competitive features into the main Overwatch game, such as ranked play where skilled players would be able to climb a rankings ladder, allowing them to be noticed by esport team organizers. In October 2016, Bobby Kotick, CEO of Blizzard's parent company Activision Blizzard, first mentioned the Overwatch League, describing how viewership of user-generated esports content was around 100 million, exceeding viewership for some professional NFL and NBA games, and saw the potential to provide "professional content" through the Overwatch League to tap into that viewership.

Overwatch League was formally announced at BlizzCon in November 2016. The announcement stated that the league would feature franchised teams that would hire skilled Overwatch players to compete in live arenas and via video streaming. Teams would provide competitors with salaries and benefits and would help "cultivate team and player development". Rather than following the format of other esports that use relegation and promotion as in the League of Legends Championship Series, Blizzard wanted to follow the American model used in more traditional physical sports. Kotick believed that "nothing like this has ever really been done before" in esports.

For Blizzard, the costs of running the league would be offset by traditional revenue streams that professional sports league have, such as promotion and advertisement, and physical League merchandise. Kotick also said that due to the digital nature of the esport, Blizzard can also obtain revenue from virtual league-based items to fans, and additional sales of Overwatch and other games, and they are able to include more lucrative "over-the-top advertising opportunities that wouldn't exist in traditional sports".  Kotick said, just prior to the start of the inaugural season, "It's a ways before you're going to see certain revenue streams, but we're already seeing a lot of traction and enthusiasm from fans." Kotick saw the importance of making this endeavor follow the same model as the NFL, in both league structure and financial opportunities, to be able to draw in large investors to establish franchises within the league, calling it a "forever investment".

Buildout

Blizzard sought out potential team owners, aiming to include teams that were localized to a geographic area. Blizzard believed having such local teams would spark more interest in esports from spectators and potential sponsors through new activities around supporting their team. A first meeting for prospective team owners was held at BlizzCon 2016 after the announcement of the league's creation, with New England Patriots owner Robert Kraft, and Los Angeles Rams owner Stan Kroenke among the attendees. During the formative period, Blizzard hired Steve Bornstein, former president of ABC Sports and CEO of NFL Network, to serve as the company's esports chair, with particular emphasis on the broadcast and presentation of games played in the Overwatch League.

Blizzard anticipated the Overwatch League would have a seven-figure payoff for the winning team at the end of a season. The first, shortened season of the league was expected to start in Q3 2017, with full seasons starting in 2018, with the league having half-year long seasonal breaks starting in Q4 of that year. Prior to starting the league, Blizzard planned to run a "combine," where players are invited to try out for guaranteed team contracts.

Little information about the league came out of Blizzard following the initial November 2016 announcement for the next several months, leading to some speculation that the league was having trouble. In May 2017, ESPN reported that the league had been having difficulties in signing franchises, which they ascribed to two issues: the high base cost of starting a franchise, starting at $20 million with higher costs in more urban markets like New York City and Los Angeles, much higher than other esports league buy-ins, and the fact that there would be no revenue sharing until 2021, making recovery of the franchise costs difficult. These difficulties led to a delay for the start of the first season.

However, during this time, Activision Blizzard was working behind the scenes to engage potential team owners, wanting to hold back as to provide large comprehensive announcements rather than trickles of information. Activision had seen the Kraft Group as a key team owner. Robert Kraft had been previously interested in investing into esports; he and Kotick had met earlier in 2013 when Kotick was looking to invest in an NFL franchise, where Kraft told him they were looking to seek investment in an esports team. Kraft spent time over the next few years evaluating other esport competitions but was not comfortable with their grassroots nature, but the Overwatch League, as explained by Kotick during BlizzCon 2016, caught his attention. By March 2017, Kraft and Activision had worked out the deal to secure the first team ownership group for the Overwatch League. Once the Kraft Group agreed to support a Boston-based team (later named the Boston Uprising), this had a snowball effect towards establishing of six other teams. The Kraft Group themselves helped to convince some of the other owners to buy into the Overwatch League.

The first seven teams were revealed in July 2017, and additional teams announced in the months following. With its first twelve teams set by mid-December, Blizzard announced that its first season would run from January to June 2018, with a pre-season in December 2017 and the championship game in July 2018.

In September 2017, Blizzard announced that they would make permanent use of Studio 1 at The Burbank Studios in Burbank, California, which it converted into the "Blizzard Arena", an esports venue which was initially used for both Overwatch Contenders and Overwatch League matches. Having a dedicated arena was seen to help establish the Overwatch League as a more orchestrated event compared to other esports tournaments, and to better connect players with their fans. Blizzard operated Overwatch Contenders in the Blizzard Arena in October as a means to test the facility's capabilities and make modifications to improve both the players' and audiences' experience in time for the pre-season of the Overwatch League in December.

In July 2017, it was discovered that the Major League Baseball association had issued a trademark dispute for the logo that Blizzard registered for the league, stating in their complaint to the United States Patent and Trademark Office that they felt Blizzard's logo was too similar to their own and may cause confusion. However, no further filings were made by Major League Baseball within the required dispute period, indicating that either the association had decided to drop the dispute, or that the association and the Overwatch League came to an undisclosed understanding to allow the league to continue to use the logo.

Launch and inaugural season
To support spectating on broadcast and streaming media, Blizzard implemented cosmetic modifications to the game. Each team was given dedicated character skins with their respective team colors, names, and logos to use in matches. Players outside of the league are able to purchase a character's team skin using "OWL Tokens", a special in-game currency, added to the game a day before the launch of the first regular season. Teams get a portion of the revenue of their team's skins. OWL Tokens were initially only obtainable through an in-game purchase with real currency; at the start of the second stage for the first season, however, Blizzard offered players tokens for watching the live broadcast of the games through any of the official channels.

Blizzard also worked to create an AI-based cameraman that could follow the action of the game as well as select key instant replays. During regular season matches, Blizzard employs a team of about 80 to 100 people to manage the game and its broadcast; this includes on-screen hosts and interviewers, play-by-play announcers or "shoutcasters", "observers" who use the AI cameraman and monitor a match from several different angles to present the best view for audiences, and broadcasting and technical support. Among those Blizzard has brought on to shoutcast matches included Christopher "MonteCristo" Mykles, Erik "DoA" Lonnquist, Matt "Mr. X" Morello, and Mitchell "Uber" Leslie. Blizzard released an Overwatch League app in early January 2018, just prior to the start of the first season, to provide schedules, results, highlights, and other details about the league's progress.

Preseason play for the inaugural season began on December 6, 2017. The first regular season game was held on January 10, 2018, as the Los Angeles Valiant defeated the San Francisco Shock before a sold-out crowd at Blizzard Arena in Los Angeles. Viewership of the first night of play through the English broadcast of Twitch reached over 415,000 viewers, while never dropping below 285,000 once play started, exceeding typical Twitch viewership numbers; additional viewers not included in this include those watching the other language broadcasts on Twitch, and MLG's own streaming media. Blizzard reported that over the first week, over 10 million viewers across all streaming formats watched league play, and that the Blizzard Arena was sold-out all four days of the week. At the start of the postseason, Blizzard and Disney signed a deal for ABC, ESPN and Disney XD to air the postseason games alongside the official Twitch streams, which would also extend into the second season. The London Spitfire became the first Overwatch League champions after they defeated the Philadelphia Fusion in the Grand Finals before 22,000 fans at the Barclays Center in Brooklyn, New York on July 27–28. The finals were watched by more than 10.8million people, a magnitude comparable to viewership of NFL regular season games.

During the break before the start of the second season, the league announced a multi-year partnership with Fanatics as the league's outfitter to make and sell team- and OWL-related clothing and other items.

Expansion 

Prior to the end of the 2018 season, Blizzard had stated their intent to add six expansion teams for the second season, bringing the total number of teams to 18. Blizzard desired to have two or three teams based in Europe, with the new franchise fee raised to $50million Blizzard began shopping for investors for new teams in March 2018 but, because of the higher projections, stated that the franchise fee for new teams in the second season would be higher than $20million. In September 2018, Blizzard announced eight new teams to play in the second season, the Atlanta Reign, Guangzhou Charge, Hangzhou Spark, Toronto Defiant, Paris Eternal, Washington Justice, Vancouver Titans, and Chengdu Hunters, bringing the total number of teams in the league to 20. In the second season, each team played a total of 28 games during the regular season, seven per stage, which meant that teams had one or two matches each week or may even have had a bye week, addressing issues related to fatigue and mental health of players that had arisen during the first season, in which teams played 40 games. While most regular season games were played at the Blizzard Arena in Los Angeles, select Homestand Weekends matches took place at locations in Dallas, Atlanta, and Los Angeles; these homestands were used to evaluate how home-and-away games would work in the following season. Overall global viewership was estimated at 218,000 per minute on average across all games, with most coming from outside the United States, which only had about 95,000 viewers per minute on average.

In May 2019, in the middle of the season, league commissioner Nate Nanzer announced he was leaving Blizzard for Epic Games, and Pete Vlastelica, CEO and president of Activision Blizzard Esports, served as league commissioner thereafter.

Blizzard signed Coca-Cola in a multiyear deal as the league's official non-alcoholic beverage sponsor, covering not only Overwatch League games but also Contenders, Open Division, and World Cup, as well as for the annual BlizzCon event. During Stage 2, Bud Light signed to be the league's alcoholic beverage sponsor for the rest of the 2019 season outside of China, with their support used to fund additional television broadcasts. Xfinity signed on as a sponsor for the 2019 OWL Playoffs and Grand Finals. Overall global viewership was estimated at 218,000 per minute on average across all games with most coming from outside the United States, which only had about 95,000 viewers per minute on average.

Transition to online play 
Ahead of the 2020 season, Blizzard signed a three-year contract with YouTube to be the exclusive broadcaster of the league, replacing Twitch. As part of the deal, they made Google Cloud Platform the preferred infrastructure provider for its game servers.

The third season of OWL was the first year that it began to fully adopt the away-and-home format, with game planned to take place in home arenas for each team. These home arenas were not required to be dedicated spaces for esports events, though there are some teams working with their local city to develop dedicated esports arenas that can also serve as venues for other sport and entertainment. For example, the Philadelphia Fusion's owner Comcast Spectacor announced plans to build the  Fusion Arena by the time of the 2021 season, but during the 2020 season, the Fusion planned its homestand games for the Metropolitan Opera House in Philadelphia and at Boardwalk Hall in Atlantic City. There were 52 homestand events scheduled throughout the season, with each team hosting at least two in their home arenas. Other teams which already secured larger arenas were set to host additional regular season events to allow the newer teams/arenas to become better established; for example, Dallas, Washington and Guangzhou, who were each scheduled five homestand events. These initial schedules were developed by the teams to best manage travel and cost, but Blizzard anticipates taking over the scheduling for the 2021 season. Blizzard provided flexibility in planning the 2020 schedule for teams to develop the necessarily logistics of hosting homestand events, including providing accommodations and practice areas for visiting teams during those weekends. This expansion was being coordinated with the Call of Duty League, a professional esports league founded by Activision in 2020 for Call of Duty that also followed the city-based model, many of which are owned by the same owners of OWL teams. Both leagues see similar issues in logistics, and coordinate efforts when applicable. Moreover, divisions were converted into conferences, with each conference having two divisions each, and stages were also eliminated, with teams still playing 28 games through the season with a planned mid-season All-Star break. League commissioner Pete Vlastelica stated that once the season began running, they would look to potential expansion of the league with a principle focus on more teams out of Europe.

However, due to restrictions put in place to counteract the COVID-19 pandemic, the league suspended all homestands and announced that it would instead move to online play after less than a month into the 2020 season. In an official statement, Blizzard Entertainment stated its intentions of returning to the homestand format "as soon as it is safe and logistically possible". As the city of Los Angeles ordered the closure of all entertainment venues, nearly everyone involved with the production including casters and the desk worked from home for the remainder of the season. Soon after the switch to online play, the league abandoned the original conferences and instead divided the teams into two regions to account for the geographical spread of the teams. Teams exclusively competed within their regions for the duration of the regular season, with the only inter-regional matches taking place at the very end of the playoffs period. The 2020 season also introduced mid-season tournaments, featuring three across the regular season, all still split by region. At the end of the 2020 season, commissioner Pete Vlastelica stepped down to take on a new position; he would be replaced by Call of Duty League commissioner, Johanna Faries, who would be commissioner of both leagues.

The league continued regional, online play throughout the fourth season, although some live events were planned to take place in China. The OWL expanded on its tournament format from 2020, featuring four midseason tournaments throughout the regular season. In July 2021, the league announced it would host its two postseason events live at two different venues: the playoffs would take place at Esports Stadium Arlington in Arlington, Texas, and the 2021 Grand Finals would be held at the Galen Center in Los Angeles, California. However, these live events were later canceled and shifted to online play due to increasing risks of COVID-19 and the Delta variant, as well as visa difficulties. A majority of the league's partners pulled their sponsorship after the California Department of Fair Employment and Housing (DFEH) filed a lawsuit against Activision Blizzard for sexual harassment and discrimination taking place within the Blizzard workplace in July 2021, including Coca-Cola, Kellogg's, State Farm, and T-Mobile. In mid-August 2021, the only sponsor present during Overwatch League broadcasts was voice-over-Internet Protocol software company TeamSpeak.

For the fifth season of the OWL, the league played on an early release of Overwatch 2. Viewership numbers during the midseason tournaments were significantly lower than that of the previous season, seeing as much as a 40.5% decrease. After the release of Overwatch 2 on October 5, 2022, the league saw a significant increase in viewership; the 2022 playoffs reached a live average minute audience of 250,000, which exceeded previous viewership numbers from when the league broadcast on Twitch in 2018 and 2019. The 2022 Grand Finals were held live for the first time since 2019. Additionally, the league secured a sponsorship deal for the playoffs with Butterfinger — their first new sponsorship since 2021.

Teams 
The league launched in 2018 with twelve teams, each based in a global city. Eight additional teams were added in the league's 2019 season. Prior to the 2020 season, the teams were divided between two divisions: the Atlantic Division with the American East Coast, Eastern Canadian and European teams, and the Pacific Division with the American West Coast, Western Canadian and Asian teams. With the 2020 season, the two divisions were elevated to conferences, keeping the same team distributions, but with now two divisions within each conference. Additionally, teams began playing in home/away games, with each team having one or more venues to host homestand weekends. However, due to the emergence of the COVID-19 pandemic, all live matches were cancelled near the beginning of the 2020 season, and teams were divided into regions. Below is the region split as of the 2023 season.

League championships 
As of the 2022 season, 20 different teams have competed in the league, with four having won at least one Grand Finals title.

Broadcasting 
Shortly prior to the beginning of the 2018 regular season, Blizzard reached a two-year deal with Twitch to be the main streaming broadcaster of the Overwatch League outside of China, reported to be valued at $90million. The service carried streams in English, French, and Korean, while users who linked their Twitch account to their Battle.net account would also be eligible for chances to receive in-game items for Overwatch while watching broadcasts. A subscription service known as the "All-Access Pass" also allowed users access to private streams and chat rooms with players, coaches, league officials and announcers, in-game currency to purchase team skins, emotes for use on Twitch chats, and discounts at Blizzard's store. This feature was expanded for the 2019 season to include the ability for viewers to use the "command center" app introduced during the 2018 Overwatch World Cup, to be able to view matches from different camera angles in real-time. The league also posted highlights on Twitter starting with the first season's All-Star Weekend and continuing into the second season, and also produced a weekly pre-game show called Watchpoint.

On July 11, 2018, Blizzard also announced a U.S. television deal with ESPN through the 2019 season, under which coverage of the 2018 playoffs would be simulcast across ESPN networks, including the semi-finals airing across ESPN2, ESPNews, and Disney–ABC Television Group sister channel Disney XD, the first night of the final airing on the main ESPN network (marking its first-ever primetime broadcast of an esports event), continuing on Disney XD the next day, and a highlights package the following Sunday on ABC. The arrangement continued into the 2019 season, with Disney XD adding regular-season broadcasts, and ABC adding broadcast television simulcasts of the Stage 1 and Stage 2 finals, and the all-star event. This partnership included broadcasting rights to the Overwatch World Cup as well. ESPN's sister Canadian network TSN also carried broadcasts on its platforms, including television encores of matches involving the league's new Canadian franchises.

German sports channel Sport1, which broadcasts to Switzerland and Austria in addition to Germany, made a two-year deal with Blizzard games live starting in the second season, partnering to form a new eSports1 sister channel.

In early 2020, YouTube reached a three-year exclusive deal to serve as broadcaster for all Activision Blizzard esports events, including the Overwatch League, Call of Duty League, and Hearthstone, replacing Twitch. The deal was reported to be valued at $160million. Alongside the agreement, Activision Blizzard also reached an agreement to use Google Cloud Platform as its preferred infrastructure provider for its game servers.

Reception
Some commentators observed that of the more than 100 players selected for teams for the first season, none of them were female. Some noted the absence of Kim "Geguri" Se-yeon, a teenage South Korean player who is recognized as one of the highest-skilled Zarya players and who was the first female player to play in the Overwatch APEX league. During the press day event prior to the start of the season, teams acknowledged they had considered signing on Geguri but noted issues with such an action. The Houston Outlaws said that there would have been a language barrier issue with her potential teammates, and complications related to co-ed housing for teams. The team also claimed that if they had brought her on board, there would have been issues from external commentators about whether it was a press stunt or an otherwise legitimate reason, and the nature of this legitimacy would shadow her career. Other teams like the London Spitfire and the New York Excelsior had looked to Geguri as a free agent but in the end desired to work from an established set of players that had already worked in leagues in the past. Team owners recognized that they want to make the player roster more diverse, but this in part requires making the community around Overwatch less toxic and more inviting. Nanzer also said he would like to see further diversity in players in the league, but was aware that there are cultures where there is a social stigma against professional video game players that can be a barrier to achieve this. By mid-February, during the Season 1 free agency window, Geguri was signed by the Shanghai Dragons, making her the first female player in the league, and the only so far.

Additional concerns were raised following several league-issued fines and suspensions issued against a number of players based on their conduct. Journalists found that some players carried over the toxic nature from their days as YouTube or Twitch broadcasters, in which players would often routinely ridicule their opponents; many of the fines and suspensions follow from similar behavior displayed at the league level. The Overwatch player base outside of the league has also had issues of toxicity, which Blizzard has been trying to handle through better reporting tools. In addition to requiring the league players to follow the code of conduct, Blizzard is also watching how these players behave on off-league broadcasts, and would fine players if they engage in toxic or inappropriate behavior even if not part of a league session, as well as publicizing when the league takes such actions. Some of this poor behavior had concerned at least one of the league's sponsors, HP, since the behavior becomes associated with their brand, though such problems were not unique to esports, according to HP product manager John Ludwig.

After the conclusion of the first stage of the inaugural season, ESPN reported that the revenue projections for the league has exceeded its expectations, with some insiders claiming that the league's revenue was four times greater than initially planned; this was in part through its Twitch streaming deal and new advertisers, such as Toyota and T-Mobile, that came on board a few weeks into play. Due to the success of the first season of the Overwatch League, Fortune named commissioner Nate Nanzer as one of their "40 Under 40" in 2018.

Entering the third season, concern had been raised on the stress of the league on its players. Fifty players had dropped from the league during the first two years, with several of them citing the stress the league places on them and mental health issues.

Legal
Dot Esports reported that the United States Department of Justice was investigating the Overwatch League in regards to their team soft cap on players' salaries in July 2021. In contrast to professional sports leagues like the NFL, where the use of player unions allows the league to implement salary caps under the Supreme Court ruling in Amalgamated Meat Cutters v. Jewel Tea Co., the Overwatch League currently lacks such unions, which would make salary caps potentially a violation of the Sherman Antitrust Act of 1890. In October 2021, Sports Business Journal reported that the OWL would be eliminating the luxury tax and maximum salary caps. A settlement between the two parties was proposed, but according to a report by former ESPN writer Jacob Wolf in late 2022, Activision Blizzard refused to terms regarding particular requests that would endure after the proposed acquisition of Activision Blizzard by Microsoft.

Legacy
Activision Blizzard used the Overwatch League model to establish the Call of Duty League in 2019. While the Call of Duty League was to have its inaugural season in 2020 with the same planned home/away format that the Overwatch League was planning the use in its third season, the COVID-19 pandemic forced the Call of Duty League to switch to a fully online format. The league was a central plot element in the seventeenth season episode "Brave N00b World" of American Dad! which was first broadcast in May 2020.

Notes

References

External links

 

 
Sports leagues established in 2017
2017 establishments in the United States
Professional sports leagues in the United States